Balázs Nánási born 22 April 1989 in Nyíregyháza) is a Hungarian football player who currently plays for Zalaegerszegi TE.

References
Profile at HLSZ.
Profile at MLSZ.

1989 births
Living people
People from Nyíregyháza
Hungarian footballers
Association football defenders
Nyíregyháza Spartacus FC players
Zalaegerszegi TE players
Nemzeti Bajnokság I players
Nemzeti Bajnokság II players
Sportspeople from Szabolcs-Szatmár-Bereg County